James Bond is a literary franchise comprising a series of novels and short stories, first published in 1953 by Ian Fleming, a British author, journalist, and former naval intelligence officer. The protagonist of the series, James Bond, is a British Secret Service agent, often referred to by his code name 007. The character first appeared in his 1953 novel Casino Royale; the books are set in a contemporary period during Fleming's lifetime from 1951 to 1964. Fleming wrote twelve novels and two collections of short stories in the series, all at his Jamaican home Goldeneye and published annually. Two of the books were published after Fleming's death in 1964.

Since Fleming's death, other authors have written continuation works. Some of these have been novelisations of episodes in the series of James Bond films, produced by Eon Productions, while others were either continuation novels or short stories. The first author was Kingsley Amis, writing under the pseudonym of Robert Markham, who produced one novel. He was followed by novelist and biographer John Pearson, who wrote a fictional biography of Bond. Novelist and screenwriter Christopher Wood wrote two novelisations in the late 1970s. John Gardner was asked to continue the series by Ian Fleming Publications, the copyright holders to the franchise; he wrote fourteen novels and two novelisations between 1981 and 1996. After Gardner retired due to ill health, author Raymond Benson continued the stories and wrote six Bond novels, three novelisations and three short stories between 1996 and 2002.

There was a hiatus of six years before Sebastian Faulks was commissioned to write a further Bond novel, which was released on 28 May 2008, the 100th anniversary of Ian Fleming's birth. This was followed in 2011 by a novel by author Jeffery Deaver, and a 2013 book by William Boyd. A further instalment was published in September 2015 by Anthony Horowitz, with a second Horowitz novel published in May 2018. A third Horowitz novel is set for release on 26 May 2022. There have also been two spin-off book series, sanctioned by Fleming's estate: Young Bond, based around Bond's adventures whilst a schoolboy at Eton College; and The Moneypenny Diaries, a series of books and short stories focusing on the supporting character Miss Moneypenny.

Ian Fleming
During World War II, Ian Fleming had mentioned to friends that he wanted to write a spy novel, but it was not until 17 February 1952 that he began to write his first novel, Casino Royale. He started writing his book at his Jamaican home Goldeneye, typing out 2,000 words in the morning, directly from his own experiences and imagination; he finished work on the manuscript in just over two months, completing it on 18 March 1952. Publishers Jonathan Cape were initially reluctant to publish the book, but were persuaded by Fleming's brother Peter (1907–1971), who had previously published material through them. On 13 April 1953 Casino Royale was released in the UK in hardcover, priced at 10s, 6d, with a cover that had been devised by Fleming himself. The first edition of 4,728 copies of Casino Royale sold out in less than a month; a second print run the same month also sold out, as did a third run of more than 8,000 books published in May 1954. At the time, Fleming was the Foreign Manager for Kemsley Newspapers, an organisation which owned The Sunday Times. Upon accepting the job, Fleming requested that he be allowed three months' holiday per year, which allowed him the freedom to write.

The novel centred on the exploits of James Bond, an intelligence officer in the 00 section of the Secret Intelligence Service, commonly known as MI6. Bond was also known by his code number, 007, and was a Royal Naval Reserve Commander. Fleming took the name for his character from that of the eponymous American ornithologist, a Caribbean bird expert and author of the definitive field guide Birds of the West Indies. Fleming based his creation on a number of individuals he came across during his time in the Naval Intelligence Division during World War II, admitting that Bond "was a compound of all the secret agents and commando types I met during the war". After the publication of Casino Royale, Fleming used his annual holiday at his house in Jamaica to write another Bond story; in total, between 1953 and 1966, two years after his death, twelve Bond novels and two short-story collections were published, with the last two books—The Man with the Golden Gun and Octopussy and The Living Daylights—published posthumously.

Books, by publication sequence

Short stories  

In the summer of 1958, the CBS television network commissioned Fleming to write episodes of a television show based on the James Bond character. This deal came about after the success of the 1954 television adaptation of Casino Royale as an episode of the CBS television series Climax! Fleming agreed to the deal, and began to write outlines for the series; however, CBS later dropped the idea. In January and February of 1959 Fleming adapted four of the television plots into short stories and added a fifth story he had written in the summer of 1958. The stories were originally titled The Rough with the Smooth, although this was changed to For Your Eyes Only for publication, which included the subtitle Five Secret Occasions in the Life of James Bond.

After Fleming's death, a second collection featuring two short stories was released, Octopussy and The Living Daylights. When the paperback edition of the book was published, "The Property of a Lady" was also included and, by 2002, "007 in New York" had been added to the book by Penguin Books.

Fictional chronologies  

Independent scholar John Griswold constructed a "high-level chronology of James Bond's life", based on the logic of depicted events and actual periods referred to in the books. This chronology differs from the publication sequence. Griswold also deliberately discounts the chronological significance of actual historic events mentioned in the novels and stories, arguing that Fleming made such references for effect without synchronising them accurately to his fiction. Fellow Bond-scholar Henry Chancellor also worked through the Bond chronology, which broadly agrees with Griswold, although there are differences. Chancellor noted that "Fleming was always vague about dates", although the novels are supposed to be set in order of publication.

Post-Fleming James Bond novels

1968–1979 

Following Fleming's death in 1964, Glidrose Productions, publishers of the James Bond novels and since renamed Ian Fleming Publications, approached author James Leasor to write a continuation novel, but he declined. Glidrose then commissioned Kingsley Amis, who, under the pseudonym of "Robert Markham", wrote Colonel Sun, which was published on 28 March 1968.

In 1973, Glidrose permitted the publication of John Pearson's fictional biography of Bond entitled James Bond: The Authorized Biography of 007. This book, written in the first person, posits that Bond was a real person about whom Ian Fleming wrote a series of adventures. This is the only Bond work where the author shares the copyright with Glidrose.

In 1977, the Eon Productions film The Spy Who Loved Me was released and, due to the radical differences between the film and the original novel of the same name, Eon productions authorised a novelization, James Bond, The Spy Who Loved Me. The 1979 film Moonraker, which other than the villain's name also substantially diverged from the source novel, was also produced in novel form, as James Bond and Moonraker; both books were written by screenwriter Christopher Wood.

1981–1996: John Gardner  

In the 1980s, the Bond series was revived with new novels by John Gardner, although initially he almost turned the series down. Between 1981 and 1996, Gardner went on to write sixteen Bond books in total; two of the books he wrote—Licence to Kill and GoldenEye—were novelizations of Eon Productions films of the same name. Gardner stated that he wanted "to bring Mr. Bond into the 1980s", although he retained the ages of the characters as they were when Fleming had left them. Even though Gardner kept the ages the same, he made Bond grey at the temples as a nod to the passing of the years. In 1996, Gardner retired from writing James Bond books due to ill health. With the influence of the American publishers, Putnam's, the Gardner novels showed an increase in the number of Americanisms used in the book, such as a waiter wearing "pants", rather than trousers, in The Man from Barbarossa. James Harker, writing in The Guardian, considered that the Gardner books were "dogged by silliness", giving examples of Scorpius, where much of the action is set in Chippenham, and Win, Lose or Die, where "Bond gets chummy with an unconvincing Maggie Thatcher".

1996–2002: Raymond Benson  

In 1996, American author Raymond Benson became the writer of the Bond novels. Benson had previously written The James Bond Bedside Companion, first published in 1984, and had also written scenarios and support material published in 1986 for the James Bond 007 tabletop role-playing game. By the time he moved on to other, non-Bond related projects in 2002, Benson had written six Bond novels, three novelizations, and three short stories. Benson followed Gardner's pattern of setting Bond in the contemporary timeframe of the 1990s and, according to academic Jeremy Black, had more echoes of Fleming's style than John Gardner. 

Benson also changed Bond's gun back to the Walther PPK, put him behind the wheel of a Jaguar XK8 and made him swear more, which led Black to note that there was an increased level of crudity lacking in either Fleming or Gardner. However, commenting in The Australian, Peter Janson-Smith, Fleming's former literary agent, noted that Benson "has got the Fleming feel ... It's as close to Fleming as I have seen." The Peterborough Evening Telegraph agreed, stating that with Benson's 007, in keeping more with Fleming, "PC-ness goes out the window and it's a more ruthless Bond with bad habits." The Sunday Mercury in 1999 said, "Benson has made Bond less gimmicky, concentrating on the action rather than the gadgets. The result is a slick enough read for dedicated Bond fans who like blazing guns (Walthers, of course) and beautiful women" and Kirkus Reviews called Benson's 007 "a chip off the old block and, if not a gilt-edged Bond, at least a double-A."

2008-Present; 

Glidrose twice approached Lee Child, author of the Jack Reacher novels, about writing a Bond novel but he turned them down. Ian Fleming Publications then commissioned Sebastian Faulks to write a continuation novel, which was released on 28 May 2008, the 100th anniversary of Ian Fleming's birth. The book—titled Devil May Care—was published in the UK by Penguin Books and by Doubleday in the US. Faulks ignored the timeframe established by Gardner and Benson and instead reverted to that used by Fleming and Amis, basing his novel in the 1960s; he also managed to use a number of the cultural touchstones of the sixties in the book. Faulks was said to be true to Bond's original character and background, providing "a Flemingesque hero" who drove a battleship grey 1967 T-series Bentley.

The American writer Jeffery Deaver was then commissioned by Ian Fleming Publications to produce Carte Blanche, which was published on 26 May 2011. The book updated Bond working for a post-9/11 agency, independent of MI5 or MI6. On 26 September 2013 the novel Solo, by William Boyd was published in the UK and by HarperCollins in Canada and the US; the book was once again set in the 1960s. In October 2014 it was announced that Anthony Horowitz was to write a further Bond instalment. The novel, titled Trigger Mortis, is set in the 1950s, and it contains material written, but previously unreleased, by Fleming. In February 2018, it was announced that a second Horowitz novel, again building upon unpublished Fleming and this time a prequel to Casino Royale, titled Forever and a Day would be published by Jonathan Cape on 31 May 2018. On 28 May 2021, it was announced that Horowitz is writing a third James Bond book, taking place after Ian Fleming's final Bond novel, The Man with the Golden Gun. On 16 December 2021, it was announced the novel titled With a Mind to Kill is set for release on 26 May 2022. It was followed only a few months later, in April 2023, with Double or Nothing by Kim Sherwood.

Young Bond  

The Young Bond series of novels was started by Charlie Higson and, between 2005 and 2009, five novels and one short story were published. The first Young Bond novel, SilverFin was also adapted and released as a graphic novel on 2 October 2008 by Puffin Books. Comic book artist Kev Walker illustrated Higson's novel. Young Bond is set in the 1930s, which would fit the chronology with that of Fleming.

Higson stated that he was instructed by the Fleming estate to ignore all other interpretations of Bond, except the original Fleming version. As the background to Bond's childhood, Higson used Bond's obituary in You Only Live Twice as well as his own and Fleming's childhoods. In forming the early Bond character, Higson created the origins of some of Bond's character traits, including his love of cars and fine wine.

In October 2013 Ian Fleming Publications announced that Stephen Cole would continue the series, with the first edition scheduled to be released in Autumn 2014. The title was later confirmed as Shoot to Kill with a release date of 6 November 2014, and it was further confirmed that Cole would be credited as Steve Cole for the release.

See also
 The Moneypenny Diaries

References

Notes

Footnotes

Sources

External links
 Penguin007.com Official website for Devil May Care and the 2008 Centenary events.
 The Young Bond Dossier Website for the Young Bond series.
 Jon Gilbert: 2021. "Collecting Ian Fleming" Podcast. read by James Fleming.

Book series introduced in 1953